(The Cheerful Man, the Thoughtful Man and the Moderate Man), HWV 55, is a pastoral ode by George Frideric Handel based on the poetry of John Milton.

History
Handel composed the work over the period of 19 January to 4 February 1740, and it was premiered on 27 February 1740 at the Royal Theatre of Lincoln's Inn Fields.  At the urging of one of Handel's librettists, Charles Jennens, Milton's two poems, "L'Allegro" and "il Penseroso", were arranged by James Harris, interleaving them to create dramatic tension between the personified characters of Milton's poems (L'Allegro or the "Joyful man" and il Penseroso or the "Contemplative man"). The first two movements consist of this dramatic dialog between Milton's poems. In an attempt to unite the two poems into a singular "moral design", at Handel's request, Jennens added a new poem, "il Moderato", to create a third movement. The popular concluding aria and chorus, "As Steals the Morn" is adapted from Shakespeare's The Tempest, V.i.65–68.

Michael O'Connell and John Powell have published an analysis of Handel's setting of the text in his musical treatment.

Dramatis Personae
 Soprano I
 Soprano II
 Alto (some versions only)
 Tenor
 Bass
 Chorus

There are no characters, no specific 'L'Allegro" or "Penseroso". The "drama" comes from alternating episodes representing the humors. Some versions give arias to different soloists. For instance, the "da capo" version of the aria "Straight mine eye hath caught new pleasures" is sung by a soprano (Gardiner, English Baroque Soloists, Monteverdi Choir, 1980) but the truncated recitative version is sung by a bass (Nelson, Ensemble Orchestra de Paris, 2000). Also, all soloists sing in the "il Moderato" section.

Dance choreography 
In 1988, Mark Morris choreographed a dance performance to accompany the music and poetry.

References

External links
 Full-text libretto hosted at wikisource.
 Score of L'Allegro, il Penseroso ed il Moderato (ed. Friedrich Chrysander, Leipzig 1859)
 Full-text libretto hosted by Stanford University.
 Full-text of Milton's L'Allegro and il Penseroso at Project Gutenberg.
 Text and Commentary on L'Allegro at Dartmouth.edu
 Text and Commentary on il Penseroso at Dartmouth.edu
 Program notes by Boston Cecilia.
 Notes by Music with Ease.
 

Oratorios by George Frideric Handel
1740 compositions